Sir Anthony Joseph Lloyd (born 25 February 1950) is a British Labour Party politician who has discontinuously served as a Member of Parliament (MP) since 1983, currently as the MP for Rochdale since 2017. He was MP for Stretford from 1983 to 1997 and Manchester Central from 1997 to 2012. He then became Greater Manchester Police and Crime Commissioner between 2012 and 2017, and interim Mayor of Greater Manchester between 2015 and 2017. Lloyd served as Shadow Secretary of State for Northern Ireland between 2018 and 2020, resigning to recover from his illness of COVID-19. He was also Shadow Secretary of State for Scotland between 2019 and 2020.

Born in Stretford, Lloyd served as a Trafford councillor from 1979 to 1984. In 1983 he was elected MP for Stretford, representing the constituency until it was abolished in 1997, at which time he was elected for Manchester Central. As an MP, Lloyd was an opposition spokesman between 1987 and 1997, a Minister of State in the Foreign and Commonwealth Office between 1997 and 1999, and Chair of the Parliamentary Labour Party from 2006 to 2012. Lloyd continued as a constituency MP until October 2012, when he stepped down to contest the 2012 Police and Crime Commissioner elections for Greater Manchester Police area. He was elected and assumed the position in November 2012. Lloyd, appointed Interim Mayor of Greater Manchester on 29 May 2015,[2] announced on 11 February 2016 that he would be seeking to become the Labour Party candidate in the Greater Manchester mayoral election, but lost the nomination to Andy Burnham before being elected as MP for Rochdale in 2017.

In 2011, the Manchester Evening News listed Lloyd among its 250 Most Influential People in Greater Manchester, describing him as "a major figure on Labour politics in Greater Manchester", and "the most powerful man in Greater Manchester" on his election as Police and Crime Commissioner in 2012. In a directory of MPs produced by The Guardian, Andrew Roth described Lloyd as "well informed, thoughtful and realistic regionalist and internationalist".

Background and family life

Lloyd was born in Stretford, on 25 February 1950, the fourth of five children of Sydney Lloyd and his wife Ciceley (née Boatte). He was raised in Stretford, and attended Stretford Grammar School for Boys, the University of Nottingham (where he gained a BSc degree in mathematics in 1972), and Manchester Business School (where he studied for an MBA degree), before becoming a lecturer in Business Studies at the University of Salford.

Lloyd's father died when he was 13, leaving his mother Ciceley, a staunch supporter of the Labour Party, to shape his values. Lloyd said: "My mother had friends who died in the Spanish Civil War. I saw that as a simple battle of good versus evil and in that sense the basic morality of politics was instilled in me. I have always thought if not fighting for what's right and just, then what is politics for?".

Lloyd married Judith Ann Tear in 1974. They have three daughters and a son. As a supporter of Manchester United, in March 2011 he tabled an early day motion in the House of Commons for their player Ryan Giggs to be knighted.

Political career

Trafford Council

Lloyd was first elected to public office when he stood as a Labour Party candidate in the 1979 Trafford Council election, winning a seat on Trafford Metropolitan Borough Council representing the Clifford ward on 4May 1979 (the day Margaret Thatcher became Prime Minister of the United Kingdom). Lloyd remained a Trafford councillor until 1984, rising to the rank of Deputy Labour Council Leader.

House of Commons

Lloyd entered the House of Commons as Member of Parliament for Stretford on 9June 1983, after the 1983 general election. He was an opposition whip between 1986 and 1987, and became the opposition spokesman for transport (1987–1992), employment (1992–1994), the environment (1994–1995), and foreign affairs (1995–1997).

Constituency boundaries were reformed for the 1997 general election, and Lloyd was selected for the Manchester Central constituency, where he was returned at each subsequent general election up to and including 2010. Following the 1997 general election which returned Tony Blair as Prime Minister, Lloyd was appointed a junior Minister of State in the Foreign and Commonwealth Office under Robin Cook, beginning on 5May 1997. In 1998, an inquiry by the Foreign Affairs Select Committee into the supply of arms from Sandline International to Africa during the Sierra Leone Civil War led to accusations that Lloyd had been dishonest and lacked depth over the trade of illicit weaponry. Lloyd's position at the Foreign Office ended in a government reshuffle on 28 June 1999.

Lloyd remained a "powerful" backbencher, and on 5December 2006 became Chair of the Parliamentary Labour Partya post which leads all Labour MPs, both government and backbench MPsby defeating the incumbent, Ann Clwyd, who was perceived as being too close to Blair. When he unseated Clwyd, the feud between Blair and Gordon Brown was much reportedLloyd, was described by journalist Michael White as a "Brownite ally", and Labour advisor Jonathan Powell wrote that Lloyd was a key member of Brown's "team of henchmen on the Labour backbenches to oppose Tony [Blair]". Lloyd was a Member of the North West Regional Select Committee from 4March 2009 to 11 May 2010. After revelations arising from the United Kingdom parliamentary expenses scandal, Lloyd was forced to apologise for over-claiming £2,210 in rent on his flat in London, adding it was "a genuine error". As Chair of the Parliamentary Labour Party, Lloyd wrote to Labour MPs urging them to publish all expenses claims.

Lloyd voted for Bryan Gould and John Prescott respectively in the Labour Party leadership elections of 1992 and 1994. Although the TheyWorkForYou political activities website declares that Lloyd "hardly ever rebels", he voted against Labour's national agenda in key areas while an MP. He joined rebel Labour MPs by voting against government policy regarding the Iraq War, and rebelled against government policy to detain terror suspects for 90 days without trial. He voted against government policy to introduce student tuition fees, and as an "anti-nuclear and anti-war campaigner", voted against the renewal or replacement of the UK Trident programme in 2007. Lloyd was strongly in favour of and voted for the reform of the House of Lords, the Identity Cards Act 2006, and the expansion of London Heathrow Airport. Lloyd supported the bid for a proposed supercasino for East Manchester, and was furious with the House of Lords and Gordon Brown for axing the scheme, adding it was "grossly unfair and outrageous" and that "those who kicked it into touch deprived a community with one of the highest levels of unemployment the opportunity to access well paid jobs and proper training". He supported the proposed Greater Manchester congestion charge, and campaigned in its favour in the 2008 referendum on the Greater Manchester Transport Innovation Fund, which was "overwhelmingly rejected" by voters.

Lloyd was the leader of the British delegation to the Parliamentary Assembly of the Council of Europe and one of its vice-presidents, a leader of the British delegation to the Western European Union, and leader of the British delegation to the Organization for Security and Co-operation in Europe (OSCE). He was head of the OSCE at a time when it was monitoring the 2010 Belarusian presidential election, which it denounced as fraudulent; Lloyd said the "election failed to give Belarus the new start it needed", adding "the people of Belarus deserved better". Lloyd was Chair of the Trade Union Group of Labour MPs from 2002 to 2012.

Lloyd contributed chapters about John Robert Clynes and George Kelley, Labour members of parliament for Manchester elected in 1906, to Men Who Made Labour, edited by Alan Haworth and Diane Hayter, and contributed a piece on the future of the Labour Party in the 2011 book What Next for Labour? Ideas for a new generation.

Police and Crime Commissioner

Lloyd was described by Andrew Roth of The Guardian as a "realistic regionalist"; he supported the creation of the Greater Manchester Combined Authority in 2011, but disagreed that there should be an elected Mayor of Greater Manchester. On 15 February 2012, Lloyd announced his intention to resign as a member of parliament to stand as a candidate for the directly elected Police and Crime Commissioner for Greater Manchester. Lloyd said he was willing to leave the Manchester Central constituencya Labour safe seatfor the PCC role because in "all the years I have been a MP, one of the abiding issues that people raised with me was fear of crime". The resulting 2012 Manchester Central by-election was scheduled for the same November polling day. In the 2012 Police and Crime Commissioner elections, Lloyd was elected as the inaugural Greater Manchester Police and Crime Commissioner, winning with 139,437 votes, a share of 51.23% and approximately 7% of the electorate, prompting the Manchester Evening News to quip that he had become "the most powerful man in Greater Manchester".

As Police and Crime Commissioner for Greater Manchester, Lloyd was one of the Labour Party's highest-profile commissioners, overseeing one of the largest police services in England and Wales outside of Greater London. He received £100,000 per year, the largest salary of any English or Welsh Police and Crime Commissioner. He was based at Salford Civic Centre and was required to devise a five-year strategic plan for Greater Manchester Police and hold Sir Peter Fahy, the force's chief constable, to account. On hearing the news that Lloyd had won the election, Fahy said "one of the key roles of the PCC was negotiating and influencing the other local authorities, the health service, businesses and other organisations... We will be expecting him to fight for GMP at a national level with the Home Office over resourcing and changes to legislation". At the end of March 2013, Lloyd published the Police and Crime Plan 2013–2016, setting his nine priorities for policing Greater Manchester. These were:

 Driving down crime
 Building and strengthening partnerships
 Tackling anti-social behaviour
 Protecting vulnerable people
 Putting victims at the centre
 Maintaining public safety, dealing with civil emergencies and emerging threats
 Dealing effectively with terrorism, serious crime and organised criminality
 Building confidence in policing services
 Protecting the police service

The plan outlined Lloyd's vision "for all of us in Greater Manchester to work together to build the safest communities in Britain".

Interim Mayor for Greater Manchester

Lloyd was appointed as Interim Mayor for Greater Manchester on 29 May 2015.[2] He subsequently announced that he would be running to become the Labour Party's candidate for the 2017 Greater Manchester Mayoral Elections on 11 February 2016.

On 9 August, Andy Burnham was selected with 51.1% of the vote. Lloyd came second with 29.1%.

Return to the Commons

In May 2017, Lloyd was selected to stand as the Labour Party's parliamentary candidate for Rochdale at the 2017 general election. He was selected after the incumbent MP, Simon Danczuk, was disallowed from standing again as the Labour candidate, owing to an ongoing internal party investigation into Danczuk's personal conduct. Lloyd was elected with a majority of 14,819.

On 3 July 2017, he was appointed by Labour leader Jeremy Corbyn as a Shadow Housing Minister. On 23 March 2018, Lloyd became Shadow Secretary of State for Northern Ireland, replacing the sacked Owen Smith.

In December 2019, he became the Shadow Secretary of State for Scotland, replacing Lesley Laird. Upon Sir Keir Starmer's election as Labour leader in spring 2020, Lloyd was replaced in this post by Ian Murray but continued as Shadow Secretary of State for Northern Ireland. Louise Haigh replaced him on an interim basis in April 2020 after he was admitted to hospital with coronavirus.

Following his discharge from Manchester Royal Infirmary Lloyd stood down from his front bench role to concentrate on his recovery from COVID-19, but vowed to continue his work as a constituency MP.

On 15 February 2021, he undertook godparenthood for Darya Chultsova, Belarusian journalist and political prisoner.

Lloyd was knighted in the 2021 Birthday Honours for public service.

Personal life

Lloyd is a supporter of Manchester United. He has ambitions to become a beekeeper.

In January 2023, Lloyd revealed he is undergoing chemotherapy after a recent cancer diagnosis. He will not attend parliament or attend face-to-face functions under medical advice to socially isolate and avoid meetings..

References

Bibliography

External links
 
 
 Office of the Police and Crime Commissioner for Greater Manchester Greater Manchester Combined Authority

1950 births
Living people
Labour Party (UK) MPs for English constituencies
Politicians from Manchester
Alumni of the University of Nottingham
Alumni of the University of Manchester
Academics of the University of Salford
Graphical, Paper and Media Union-sponsored MPs
UK MPs 1983–1987
UK MPs 1987–1992
UK MPs 1992–1997
UK MPs 1997–2001
UK MPs 2001–2005
UK MPs 2005–2010
UK MPs 2017–2019
UK MPs 2010–2015
People educated at Stretford Grammar School
Police and crime commissioners in England
People from Stretford
Police and crime commissioners of Greater Manchester
Labour Party police and crime commissioners
Councillors in Greater Manchester
Labour Party (UK) councillors
Labour Party (UK) mayors
Alumni of the Manchester Business School
Members of the Parliament of the United Kingdom for Rochdale
UK MPs 2019–present
Knights Bachelor